Peter Ionatana Jack Umaga-Jensen (born 31 December 1997) is a New Zealand rugby union player who currently plays as an center or outside back for  in New Zealand's domestic Mitre 10 Cup and for the  in Super Rugby Aotearoa.

Early life and education

Umaga-Jensen was born in Lower Hutt, in the Wellington Region of the North Island of New Zealand. He started playing rugby for his local side Wainuiomata Rugby Football Club when he was 5 years old.

Umaga-Jensen attended Scots College in the city and won the Premier League 1 title with them in 2014.

Senior career

Umaga-Jensen was named in the Wellington Lions squad for the 2016 Mitre 10 Cup and quickly became a regular in the side, playing 8 times and scoring 1 try.

Super Rugby career

After one season at provincial level, Umaga-Jensen was signed up by defending Super Rugby champions, the  ahead of the 2017 Super Rugby season. He made his debut against the Reds in 2018, but had a hard time with injuries. At end of the 2019 season he signed a new deal with the Canes that will keep him stay at the club until 2021.

In 2020, Umaga-Jensen established himself as first-choice 13 for the Hurricanes during the Super Rugby Aotearoa competition. He earned praise for his performances, in particular the win against the Crusaders. The match was specially significant since it ended the Cantabrians' four-year unbeaten home run — the Crusaders' first loss at home in 37 games since they were also beaten by the Hurricanes in July 2016.

New Zealand U20s

Umaga-Jensen was a member of the New Zealand Under 20 side which competed in the 2016 World Rugby Under 20 Championship in England where he scored a try in his only appearance. He also represented his country the following year, helping the New Zealand U20's win the 2017 Junior World Rugby Championship held in Georgia.

All Blacks 
Umaga-Jensen made his international debut for the All Blacks on 18 October 2020 against Australia at Auckland.

Family
Peter's twin brother Thomas Umaga-Jensen has also represented Wellington at rugby at senior level and has played Super Rugby for the Highlanders. They are the nephews of former All Black captain Tana Umaga and the late former All Black Jerry Collins.

References

1997 births
Living people
New Zealand rugby union players
Rugby union fullbacks
Wellington rugby union players
People educated at Scots College, Wellington
Rugby union players from Lower Hutt
Rugby union centres
Rugby union wings
Hurricanes (rugby union) players
New Zealand international rugby union players